Rhythm of Love may refer to:

Albums
 Rhythm of Love (Anita Baker album) or its title song (1994)
 Rhythm of Love (Kylie Minogue album) or its title song (1990)
 Rhythm of Love, a 1997 album by DJ Company or its title song

Songs
 "Rhythm of Love" (DJ Company song) (1994)
 "Rhythm of Love" (Alyona Lanskaya song) (2012)
 "Rhythm of Love" (Plain White T's song) (2010)
 "Rhythm of Love" (Scorpions song) (1988)
 "Rhythm of Love" (Yes song) (1987)
 "Rhythm of Love", a 2014 song by Danity Kane from DK3
 "Rhythm of Love", a 1990 song by Krokus from Stampede